Wah Ming Estate is a mixed TPS and public housing estate in Wo Hop Shek, Fanling, New Territories, Hong Kong, near Wa Mei Shan and Wo Hing Sports Centre. It consists of seven residential buildings built in 1990. The flats in the estate were sold under Tenants Purchase Scheme Phase 2 in 1999.

Yan Shing Court and Cheong Shing Court are Home Ownership Scheme courts in Wo Hop Shek near Wah Ming Estate, built in 1993 and 2000 respectively.

Yung Shing Court ( is a mixed public and HOS court in Wo Hop Shek near Wah Ming Estate. It consists of three residential buildings completed in 2000.

Houses

Wah Ming Estate

Yan Shing Court

Cheong Shing Court

Yung Shing Court

Demographics
According to the 2016 by-census, Wah Ming Estate had a population of 15,611, Yan Shing Court had a population of 6,955, Cheong Shing Court had a population of 4,107 while Yung Shing Court had a population of 8,005. Altogether the population amounts to 34,678.

Politics
For the 2019 District Council election, the estate fell within two constituencies. Wah Ming Estate is located in the Wah Ming constituency, which was formerly represented by Chan Wai-tat until July 2021, while Yan Shing Court, Cheong Shing Court and Yung Shing Court fall within the Yan Shing constituency, which was formerly represented by Lam Shuk-ching until May 2021.

See also

Public housing estates in Fanling

References

Residential buildings completed in 1990
Wo Hop Shek
Public housing estates in Hong Kong
Tenants Purchase Scheme